Demetri Psaltis is a Greek-American electrical engineer who was the Dean of the School of Engineering at École Polytechnique Fédérale de Lausanne from 2007 to 2017. He is a Professor in Bioengineering and Director of the Optics Laboratory of the EPFL. He is one of the founders of the term and the field of optofluidics. He is also well known for his past work in holography, especially with regards to optical computing, holographic data storage, and neural networks. He is an author of over 1100 publications, contributed more than 20 book chapters, invented more than 50 patents, and currently has a h-index of 98.

Education
Demetri Psaltis received his B.S. (1974), M.S. (1975), and Ph.D. (1977) at Carnegie Mellon University.

Academic career
From 1980 to 2007, he worked at Caltech as an Assistant Professor (1980–1985), Associate Professor (1985–1990), Full Professor (1990–1996), Executive Officer for Computation and Neural Systems (1992–1996), Director for the National Science Foundation Center for Neuromorphic Systems Engineering (1996–1999), Thomas G. Myers Professor (1996–2007) and Director for the DARPA Center for Optofluidic Integration (2004–2007). In 2007, he moved to Switzerland as a Professor and Dean of the School of Engineering at EPFL.

His current research focuses on optofluidics and nonlinear optics particularly in scattering media.

His past research had focused on optical computing, holographic data storage, and neural networks.

Honors
2012 Emmett N. Leith Medal.
2006 SPIE Dennis Gabor Award.
2005 IEEE Fellow.
2003 Humboldt Prize for Senior U.S. Scientists.
2002 NASA Space Act Award.
1997 SPIE Fellow.
1989 International Commission for Optics (ICO) Prize for contributions in Optical Information Processing.
OSA Fellow.

Lectures 

 1992 - Optical implementation of neural networks Lecture sponsored by the Dept. of Electrical and Computer engineering, University of California, San Diego. Electrical and Computer Engineering Distinguished Lecture Series. Digital Object Made Available by Special Collections & Archives, UC San Diego.

References

External links
 Personal page of Demetri Psaltis on the EPFL website
 Optics Laboratory

Date of birth missing (living people)
1953 births
Living people
Greek electrical engineers
American electrical engineers
Fellow Members of the IEEE
Fellows of SPIE
Carnegie Mellon University alumni
Optical engineers
Academic staff of the École Polytechnique Fédérale de Lausanne
California Institute of Technology faculty
American people of Greek descent
American university and college faculty deans